TRC Turf Ground is an association football stadium located in Srinagar, Jammu and Kashmir, India. Owned by Jammu & Kashmir Football Association, It is currently the home ground of Real Kashmir and most JKFA Professional League teams.

History
The stadium was made at the cost of 4.5 crore (45 million) rupees and unveiled in September 2014 by then Chief Minister, Omar Abdullah. In 2017, the government and sports minister Imran Raza Ansari approved high mast flood lighting system to allow night matches.
The first tournament was organised in 2015 namely Football Fanatics Knockout Tournament by Fanatics Group in collaboration with Jammu & Kashmir Football Association

Tenants
Since 2015, the ground is being used in the I-League 2nd Division as the home ground for Lonestar Kashmir FC, and I-League for Real Kashmir FC. It has also been used for hosting JKFA Professional League matches.

See also 
 Sports in Jammu and Kashmir

References

External links

Football venues in Jammu and Kashmir
Sport in Srinagar
Sports venues completed in 2014
2014 establishments in Jammu and Kashmir